The 2010–11 Bobsleigh World Cup was a multi race tournament over a season for bobsleigh. The season started on 22 November 2010 in Whistler, Canada and ended on 27 January 2011 in Königssee, Germany. The World Cup was organised by the FIBT who also run World Cups and Championships in skeleton. This season was sponsored by Viessmann.

Calendar 
Below is the schedule of the 2010/11 season.

Results

Two-man 

Notes
Note 1: Patrice Servelle's silver medal in the Calgary World Cup race was Monaco's first ever World Cup medal.

Four-man

Two-woman 

Notes
Note 1: The women's bobsleigh World Cup race scheduled for 10 December in Park City was cancelled due to blowing snow which prevented the timing eyes from working correctly. It was made up on 17 December in Lake Placid.

Standings

Two-man

Four-man

Two-woman

References

External links 
 FIBT

Bobsleigh World Cup
World Cup
World Cup